Rodionovo is a rural locality (a village) in Nikolskoye Rural Settlement, Ust-Kubinsky District, Vologda Oblast, Russia. The population was 16 as of 2002.

Geography 
Rodionovo is located 35 km northwest of Ustye (the district's administrative centre) by road. Shabarovo is the nearest rural locality.

References 

Rural localities in Ust-Kubinsky District